Cardinal O'Hara High School is a private, Roman Catholic high school in Tonawanda, New York within the Diocese of Buffalo.

Notable alumni
Robin Schimminger, New York State Assembly, 140th District
Bill Scherrer, Major League Baseball pitcher

References

Catholic secondary schools in New York (state)
Educational institutions established in 1961
High schools in Erie County, New York
1961 establishments in New York (state)